Amr Ibrahim Mostafa Seoud (born 10 June 1986 in Damietta) is an Egyptian sprinter who specializes in 100 & 200 metres. His personal best times are 10.13 and 20.36 seconds in the 100 and 200 metres.

He ranked sixth in the 100 metres at the 2006 African Championships. In the 200 metres he won the 2007 Summer Universiade, and competed at the 2007 World Championships without reaching the final round. He also competed in 60 metres at the World Indoor Championships in 2003 and 2008.

Seoud represented Egypt at the 2008 Summer Olympics in Beijing. He competed at the 200 metres and placed fifth in his first round heat in a time of 20.75 seconds. His record was among the ten best losing times, which granted him a slot in the second round. He improved his time in the second round to 20.55 seconds, placing sixth. This performance was not enough to compete at the semi finals.

At the 2012 Summer Olympics he competed in both the 100 and 200 metres, but did not qualify from the heats.

Achievements

References

1986 births
Living people
People from Damietta
Egyptian male sprinters
Olympic athletes of Egypt
Athletes (track and field) at the 2008 Summer Olympics
Athletes (track and field) at the 2012 Summer Olympics
World Athletics Championships athletes for Egypt
Mediterranean Games gold medalists for Egypt
Athletes (track and field) at the 2009 Mediterranean Games
African Games gold medalists for Egypt
African Games medalists in athletics (track and field)
Universiade medalists in athletics (track and field)
Mediterranean Games medalists in athletics
Athletes (track and field) at the 2007 All-Africa Games
Athletes (track and field) at the 2011 All-Africa Games
Universiade medalists for Egypt
Medalists at the 2007 Summer Universiade
21st-century Egyptian people